D3T Ltd is a British video game developer based in Runcorn. The studio offers work-for-hire video game development services and, as of 2021, they employ over 100 people.

History 
The developer was formed by Jamie Campbell and Stephen Powell in 2011. The studio was sold to Keywords Studios in 2017 for £3 million.

Games

Remasters

Ports

Collaborations

References

External links 
 

2011 establishments in England
2017 mergers and acquisitions
Companies based in Cheshire
British subsidiaries of foreign companies
Runcorn
Keywords Studios
Video game companies established in 2011
Video game companies of the United Kingdom
Video game development companies